Francis Griffith may refer to:
Francis Griffith (police officer) (1878–1942), Inspector General, Bombay Police and Chief Constable, New Scotland Yard
Francis Huntly Griffith (1885–1958), Welsh-born tea planter in Ceylon, member of the Parliament of Ceylon (1947–1952)
Francis M. Griffith (1849–1927), U.S. Representative from Indiana
Francis Llewellyn Griffith (1862–1934), British Egyptologist

See also
Frank Griffith (disambiguation)